The Worms massacre was the murder of at least 800 Jews from Worms, Holy Roman Empire (now Germany), at the hands of crusaders under Count Emicho in May 1096.

The massacre at Worms was one of a number of attacks against Jewish communities perpetrated during the First Crusade (1096–1099). Followers of Count Emicho arrived at Worms on May 18, 1096. Soon after his arrival, a rumour spread that the Jews had boiled a Christian alive, and used his corpse to contaminate water to poison the town's wells. The local populace later joined forces with Emicho and launched a savage attack on the town's Jews, who had been given sanctuary in Bishop Adalbert's palace, though others chose to remain outside its walls. They were the first to be massacred.

After eight days, Emicho's army, assisted by local burghers broke in and slaughtered those seeking asylum there. The Jews were in the midst of reciting the Hallel prayer for Rosh Chodesh Sivan.

In all, from 800 to 1,000 Jews were killed, with the exception of some who committed suicide and a few who were forcibly baptised. One, Simchah ben Yitzchak ha-Cohen, stabbed the bishop's nephew while being baptised and was consequently killed.  One of the most famous victims was Minna of Worms.

See also

Av HaRachamim
Jews in the Middle Ages
Medieval antisemitism
Rhineland massacres
Minna of Worms
Kalonymus Ben Meshullam

References

11th-century massacres
Massacres in Germany
Jewish German history
First Crusade
Medieval anti-Jewish pogroms
Worms, Germany
History of Rhineland-Palatinate
1090s in the Holy Roman Empire
1096 in Europe